KirchGruppe (KirchGroup) was a German media group founded by Leo Kirch (1926–2011) in the 1960s. By 2000, it controlled a 52.5 percent stake in what would become the country's biggest broadcaster.

The group collapsed in 2002 largely due to the debts associated with the purchase of sports rights for its television channels and the launch of pay-TV services.

The holding company for the group was Taurus Holding which had three major subsidiaries, KirchMedia, Kirch PayTV and KirchBeteiligung. KirchMedia declared bankruptcy on 8 April 2002, followed by KirchPayTV on 8 May 2002 and finally KirchBeteiligung on 12 June 2002 along with Taurus Holding.

Alwaleed bought 3.19 percent of KirchMedia in 1999, and 3.3 percent of KirchPayTV for $150 million.

KirchMedia
KirchMedia's main assets were KirchSport, which held the TV rights to the World Cup and other sports; 52.5% of ProSiebenSat.1 Media, an owner of main satellite channels; the DSF sports channel; TaurusProduktion, a film and TV production group; and TaurusLizenz, owner of fiction and media medium rights.

KirchMedia declared bankruptcy on 8 April 2002.

KirchPayTV
KirchPayTV was majority owned by Taurus Holding, however BSkyB held 22% along with Lehman Brothers (2.4%) and Saudi Prince Al-Waleed (3.12%). The company's main asset was the Premiere pay-TV network.

KirchPayTV filed for bankruptcy on 8 May 2002.

KirchBeteiligung
KirchBeteiligung's main assets were its majority share of Formula One's commercial rights (through Speed Investments) and its 40.33% stake in the media company, Axel Springer AG.

KirchBeteiligung filed for bankruptcy on 12 June 2002, along with the Taurus Holding parent company of the Kirch Group.

References

Television companies of Germany
Defunct companies based in Munich
German companies established in 1955
German companies disestablished in 2002
Mass media companies established in 1955
Mass media companies disestablished in 2002